Robinhood is a hamlet in Medstead Rural Municipality No. 497, Saskatchewan, Canada. The hamlet is located at the junction of Highway 794 and Range road 160, approximately 10 km west of the Village of Medstead.

The name Robin was chosen for the hamlet for the new post office in 1923 because a school was given the same moniker three years earlier. However, the federal post office department told locals they couldn't have Robin because the agency didn't want confusion with a Roblin post office in Manitoba. The owners of the general store and post office, John and Annie Wilson, submitted their second name choice - Robinhood - and it was accepted by federal officials.

By 1971 the post office was disbanded and most of Robinhood's residents left. For many years after the post office closure, Robinhood was even taken off government highway maps.

See also

 List of communities in Saskatchewan
 Hamlets of Saskatchewan
 List of ghost towns in Saskatchewan

References

External links
Horse Shoe Tourism Region

Medstead No. 497, Saskatchewan
Unincorporated communities in Saskatchewan
Ghost towns in Saskatchewan
Division No. 16, Saskatchewan